RPN NewsWatch Junior Edition is another installation to the longest-running news program NewsWatch aired on Radio Philippines Network in the Philippines and the first reality-based TV workshop for future journalists from June 7, 2008 to August 16, 2008 and as a Magazine show on October 11, 2008.

RPN NewsWatch Junior Edition reporters

Nine High School students from various schools in Metro Manila were chosen from a series of tests and workshops conducted by the Radio Philippines Network News and Public Affairs to become field reporters for NewsWatch Junior Edition. Miguel Sarne also known as "Li'l Man Guile" was the host for the First Season.

Season 2 Hosts
 Abiel Anselmo 
 Alex Santos 
 Charis Antalan 
 Cheeno Almario 
 Janeena Chan 
 John David Dychioco 
 Joyce Manansala 
 Yasser Marta 
 Miguel Sarne 
 Jon Kenneth Salacup 
 Trish Terrada 

Season 3 Hosts and segments
 Miguel Sarne -Get Connected
 Janeena Chan -Glitz and Glam
 Charis Antalan -Our Camp
 Trish Terada -Stay healthy
 Alex Santos -Active
 Joyce Manansala - Keep it Green

History
Radio Philippines Network decided to put up a reality-based television workshop entitled NewsWatch Junior Edition. It was first aired as a TV workshop on June 7, 2008. They were put in a series of workshops, training and many others. On August 9, 2008, their reports were aired and the voting process started. On August 16, 2008 edition, Joyce Manansala was declared the Grand Champion while Charis Antalan was the First Runner-Up and Cheeno Almario became the Viewers Choice Awardee. From August 23, 2008 to October 4, 2008, it was aired as a re-run. On October 11, 2008, it was aired as a magazine show where every week different stories are featured. The contestants are also the hosts of this show. Its second season was aired from October 11, 2008 to January 4, 2009. The third season had its first airing on May 30, 2009.  The last episode of Newswatch Junior Edition aired on August 16, 2009 due to reformatted as Solar TV. Its former reporter Janeena Chan became RPN NewsWatch's segment reporter on TeenWatch.

Segments
Get Connected
Active!
Glitz and Glam
Our camp
Stay Healthy
Keep it Green

Trivia
 Miguel Sarne, John Dychioco and Charis Antalan were the main anchors of Jr. News (2004–2005).
 Joyce Manansala, Cheeno Almario and Alex Santos were the reporters of Jr. News (2004–2005).
 Alex Santos is the namesake of ABS-CBN news anchor Alex Santos but her real name is Ma. Alexandra Janelle Santos.
 Joyce Manansala appeared in a segment of Disney Channel-Asia.
 Janeena Chan appeared in the commercials of Cream Silk Hair Dare, Juicy Cologne, Jollibee and Rexona.
 Janeena Chan was a host of Kids TV (2004–2006).
 Janeena Chan was awarded Best Children Show Host Award for Kids TV given by the PMPC 20th STAR AWARDS for TV 2006 at the age of 13.
 Janeena Chan also appeared in 2007 Disney's High School Musical On Stage here in the Philippines.
 Janeena Chan was 2007 Candy and 2006 Total Girl model search finalist.
 Janeena Chan was featured in 2006 December WOMEN TODAY ASIA in the Young Women's Today Section as 'A Multi-talented Teen'
 Janeena Chan is a voice talent of the radio commercial for Ponds facial care and the TV Commercial for Lifebuoy Anti-Dandruff shampoo soon to be aired.
 Janeena Chan was a Storyteller of Enchanted Kingdom. (December 2007)
 Janeena Chan wrote an article for Enchanted Kingdom Comic Book Volume 6
 Miguel "Li'l Man Guile" Sarne is a DJ of Magic 89.9 FM (2007 to present).
 Miguel Sarne is the voice of the English-speaking Bronson in the movie "Sakal, Sakali Saklolo" starring Judy Ann Santos and Ryan Agoncillo (2007).
 Miguel Sarne is the voice of Raj in an Indian animation film released in December 2008.
 Miguel Sarne is Royal Tru Orange's Ambassador for Radio (2008).
 Miguel Sarne presented an award in the 1st Nick Awards in the Philippines last November 2008.
 Miguel Sarne presented the Best Male Pop Artist in the 1st Radio Music Awards on June 9, 2009.
 Miguel Sarne is still the YOUNGEST RADIO DJ in the Philippines at 14 (he started his radio career in Magic 89.9 FM when he was 11 years old.)
 Triciah Terada became a 9News / CNN Philippines correspondent.

See also
 RPN NewsWatch

External links
 http://newswatchjredition.multiply.com

Philippine television news shows
2008 Philippine television series debuts
2009 Philippine television series endings
Radio Philippines Network original programming
RPN News and Public Affairs shows